Harry Kusnick was an American sound engineer. He was nominated for an Academy Award for Best Special Effects at the 17th Academy Awards (1945) for work on the film Secret Command.

References

External links

Year of birth missing
Year of death missing
American audio engineers
Place of birth missing
Place of death missing